Nathan Morland (born 20 December 1976) is a New Zealand former cricketer. He played 34 first-class and 38 List A matches for Otago between 1996 and 2004.

See also
 List of Otago representative cricketers

References

External links
 

1976 births
Living people
New Zealand cricketers
Otago cricketers
Cricketers from Dunedin